Beautiful Life may refer to:

Music

Albums
 Beautiful Life (Bruce Guthro album), 2006
 Beautiful Life (Dianne Reeves album), 2014
 Beautiful Life (Doc Walker album), 2008
 Beautiful Life (Guy Sebastian album), 2004
 Beautiful Life (Jimmy Greene album), 2014
 Beautiful Life (Martha Davis album), 2008
 Beautiful Life (Shy Nobleman album), 2005
 Beautiful Life (Vallejo album), 1998
 Beautiful Life (Chuck Brown album), 2014
 Beautiful Life (Rick Astley album), 2018

Songs
 "Beautiful Life" (Ace of Base song), 1995
 "Beautiful Life" (Lydia Canaan song), 1995
 "Beautiful Life" (Måns Zelmerlöw song), 2013
 "Beautiful Life" (Armin van Buuren song), 2013
 "Beautiful Life" (Nick Fradiani song), 2015
 "Beautiful Life" (Lost Frequencies song), 2016, featuring Sandro Cavazza
 "Beautiful Life" (Rick Astley song), 2018
 "Beautiful Life" (Union J song), 2013
Beautiful Life (Cobra Starship song), 2021
 "Beautiful Life", a track from the 2007 album Chromophobia by Gui Boratto
 "Beautiful Life", a song by James Morrison from his 2011 album The Awakening
 "Beautiful Life", a song by José Galisteo

Other 
 Beautiful Life (Japanese TV series), a 2000 series starring Takuya Kimura
 Beautiful Life (Chinese TV series), a 2007 series starring Yao Qiangyu
 The Beautiful Life, a 2009 American drama series
 Beautiful Life Television, a Buddhist-based television station in Taiwan

See also
 A Beautiful Life (disambiguation)
 Bella Vita (disambiguation), "Beautiful Life" in Italian
 Belle vie (disambiguation), "Beautiful Life" in French
 It's a Beautiful Life (disambiguation)
 Life Is Beautiful (disambiguation)